The Ruby Cord is the seventh studio album by the British avant-garde folk musician Richard Dawson, released on 18 November 2022 by Domino Recording Company. 

The record was described as the final piece in a trilogy of albums, together with previous releases Peasant and 2020, set in "a sort of liminal reality that straddles real life and something more virtual" in the future.

Reception 

The Ruby Cord received acclaim from music critics. At Metacritic, which assigns a normalized rating out of 100 to reviews from mainstream critics, the album received an average score of 81 based on fifteen reviews, indicating "universal acclaim".

Track listing 

All tracks are written by Richard Dawson.

References 

2022 albums
Richard Dawson (musician) albums